Tuas Bus Terminal (Chinese: 大士巴士终站) is a bus terminal located in Tuas in the western part of Singapore. This terminal serves industrial workers at Jurong Industrial Estate and Tuas Industrial Estate from Boon Lay Bus Interchange.

The terminal was relocated to a new site above the Tuas Depot on 7 October 2017. The terminal is connected to the Tuas Link MRT station, allowing for convenient transfers. On 18 June 2017, 2 new services, Bus Services 247 and 248, were introduced in conjunction with the Tuas West MRT Extension opening. On 7 October 2017, all 4 services were relocated to the new site.

Bus Contracting Model

Under the new bus contracting model, all the bus routes terminating at the terminal are under the Jurong West Bus Package.

References

External links
 Interchanges and Terminals (SBS Transit)

Bus stations in Singapore
Tuas